Fred Elliott may refer to:

People
 Fred Elliott (1879–1960), Australian rules football player
 Fred Elliott (1903–1982), Canadian ice hockey player

Fictional character
 Fred Elliott, character from the soap opera Coronation Street

See also
 Fred (name)
 Elliott (name)